Joe Mabbott is an American record producer and studio audio engineer who has worked with many independent and mainstream artists of the 1990s 2000s and 2010s including Atmosphere, Snoop Dogg, Brother Ali, Cloud Cult and The Matches.

In addition to record engineering, Joe Mabbott owns and operates The Hideaway Studio housed in the historic Grain Belt Brewery building in Northeast Minneapolis. The main live room at the Hideaway is a generously sized at 25x35 feet with 14-foot ceilings, with half of the room being concrete and exposed brick, and the other half sheetrock and sound-treated, allowing exceptional ambience when desired. For additional tracking purposes, The Hideaway Studio has two rooms in addition to the main live room at its disposal—the vocal booth, which at 9x14 feet can easily accommodate a drum kit or an isolated bagpiper, and a medium-sized room measuring 11x20 feet, made largely of reflective tile that allows for a massive drum sound.

Credits
Joe Mabbott produced and/or engineered the following albums:

 Atmosphere - God Loves Ugly
 Atmosphere - Seven's Travels
 Atmosphere - You Can't Imagine How Much Fun We're Having
 Atmosphere - Strictly Leakage
 Atmosphere - When Life Gives You Lemons, You Paint That Shit Gold
 Atmosphere - Leak at Will
 Atmosphere - To All My Friends, Blood Makes The Blade Holy: The Atmosphere EP's
 Atmosphere - The Family Sign
 Brother Ali - Champion EP
 Brother Ali - Shadows on the Sun
 Brother Ali - The Truth Is Here
 Brother Ali - The Undisputed Truth
 Brother Ali - Us
 Brother Ali - Mourning in America and Dreaming in Color
 Cloud Cult - Advice from the Happy Hippopotamus
 Dessa - A Badly Broken Code
 Dessa - Castor, the Twin
 Doomtree - False Hopes
 Doomtree - Doomtree
 Doomtree - No Kings
 Evidence - The Weatherman LP
 Felt - Felt, Vol. 2: A Tribute to Lisa Bonet
 Gayngs - Relayted
 Heiruspecs - A Tiger Dancing
 Heiruspecs - 10 Years Strong
 Heiruspecs - Heiruspecs
 Jake One - White Van Music
 M.anifest - Manifestations
 Marianne Dissard - L'Abandon
 Marianne Dissard - The Cat. Not Me"
 The Matches - A Band in Hope Minus the Bear - Interpretaciones del Oso Murs - The End of the Beginning Musab - Respect the Life Pigeon John - Pigeon John and the Summertime Pool Party The Plastic Constellations - Crusades The Plastic Constellations - We Appreciate You P.O.S - Ipecac Neat P.O.S - Audition P.O.S - Never Better Psalm One - Death of the Frequent Flyer Snoop Dogg - The West Coast Blueprint''

References

External links 
 TheHideawayMPLS.com

American record producers
American audio engineers
Year of birth missing (living people)
Living people